Anoosha Shahgholi (born 10 November 1981) is an Iranian tennis player.

Shahgholi has a career high ATP singles ranking of 847 achieved on 7 May 2007. He also has a career high ATP doubles ranking of 719 achieved on 10 July 2006.

Shahgholi represents Iran at the Davis Cup where he has a W/L record of 38–27.

Future and Challenger finals

Doubles 3 (2–1)

External links

1981 births
Living people
Iranian male tennis players
Sportspeople from Tehran